John Miller may refer to:

Politics

United States
John Miller (Indiana judge) (1840–1898), Justice of the Indiana Supreme Court, 1891-1893
John Miller (North Dakota politician) (1843–1908), Governor of North Dakota, 1889–1891
John Miller (Missouri politician) (1781–1846), Governor of Missouri, 1826–1832; U.S. Representative from Missouri, 1837–1843
John Miller (Washington politician) (1938–2017), U.S. Representative from Washington
John Miller (New York politician) (1774–1862), U.S. representative from New York
John Miller (Virginia politician) (1947–2016), State Senator from Virginia
John Miller (police official) (born 1958/9), New York Police Department official, former FBI official, journalist and former television host
John E. Miller (1888–1981), U.S. Congressman from Arkansas and federal judge
John E. Miller (Arkansas politician) (1929–2014), U.S. businessman and state representative in Arkansas
John Franklin Miller (senator) (1831–1886), U.S. Senator from California, uncle of John Franklin Miller the Washington congressman
John Franklin Miller (representative) (1862–1936), U.S. Representative from Washington
John Gaines Miller (1812–1856), U.S. Representative from Missouri
John Guerrant Miller (1795–1871), mayor of Columbus, Ohio
John J. Miller Jr. (1923–2012), American politician in New Jersey
John K. Miller (1819–1863), U.S. Representative from Ohio
John Lester Miller (1901–1978), U.S. federal judge
John Lucas Miller (1831–1864), attorney and state legislator in South Carolina
John Miller (pseudonym), a pseudonym used by Donald Trump

Other countries
John Miller (engineer) (1805–1883), MP for Edinburgh 1868–1874
John Ontario Miller (1857–1943), British Indian civil servant
John Stewart Miller (1844–1936), former Member of Provincial Parliament in Ontario
Sir John Miller, 2nd Baronet (1665–1721), MP for Chichester 1698–1700, 1701–1705 and 1710–1713 and Sussex 1701
Sir John Miller, 3rd Baronet (1867–1918), Justice of the Peace and magistrate for Kent, 1889
John Miller (New South Wales politician) (1870–1934), New South Wales state MP
Sir John Riggs Miller (c. 1744–1798), Anglo-Irish politician
John Miller (South Australian politician) (1840–1919), member of the South Australian House of Assembly
John Classon Miller (1836–1884), Ontario lumber merchant and political figure
John Miller (mayor), New Zealand politician and veterinarian, mayor of Invercargill

Military
John G. Miller (Medal of Honor), 1863 Medal of Honor recipient
John Miller (1865 Medal of Honor recipient) (1839–1882), Medal of Honor recipient
Sir John Miller (equerry) (1919–2006), British lieutenant-colonel and Crown Equerry
John C. Miller Jr., United States Marine Corps general
John H. Miller (born 1925), United States Marine Corps general
John P. Miller (naval officer) (fl. 1920s), United States Navy officer and acting Naval Governor of Guam
John W. Miller, United States Navy admiral
John E. Miller (general) (born 1941), U.S. Army general
John Grider Miller (1935–2009), United States Marine Corps officer
John M. Miller III, American naval aviator

Arts

Visual arts
John Miller (American artist) (born 1954), American visual artist, writer and musician based in New York and Berlin
John Miller (Cornish artist) (1931–2002), English artist specializing in beach scenes
John Miller (botanical illustrator) (1715–c. 1792), German engraver, painter, and botanist
John Douglas Miller (1860–1903), English engraver
John Frederick Miller (1759–1796), English illustrator
John Paul Miller (1918–2013), American jewellery designer and goldsmith
John M. Miller (artist) (born 1939), American painter based in Los Angeles

Film, television and music
John Miller (film producer), American film producer
John Miller (musician) (born 1945), Broadway music coordinator and actor
John Miller Jr. (born 1942), American bassoonist, principal of the Minnesota Orchestra
John D. Miller (television executive) (born 1950), NBC advertising and marketing executive
John Lloyd Miller, American filmmaker
John P. Miller (born 1976), birthname of actor and singer Austin Miller
John Miller, a pseudonym of Tjut Djalil (born 1932), Indonesian filmmaker

Sports

Association football
John Miller (footballer, born 1870) (1870–1933), Scottish footballer with Liverpool and Sheffield Wednesday
John Miller (footballer, born 1878) (1878–?), Scottish footballer for Burnley
John Miller (footballer, born 1890) (1890–1932), Scottish footballer
John Miller (footballer, born 1895) (1895–1956), Scottish footballer for Liverpool and Aberdeen
John Miller (Queen's Park footballer), Scottish footballer
John Miller (St Mirren footballer) (fl. 1924–1934), Scottish footballer

American football
John Miller (fullback) (1894–1971), NFL player, 1921
John Miller (offensive lineman, born 1934) (1934–2015), NFL player, 1956–1960
John Miller (offensive lineman, born 1993), American football player
John Miller (linebacker) (born 1960), NFL player, 1987
Bing Miller (American football) (1903–1964), NFL player, 1929–1931

Baseball
Ox Miller (John Anthony Miller, 1915–2007), American baseball pitcher
John Miller (first baseman) (born 1944), baseball player in the United States (1966–1969) and Japan (1970–1972)
John Miller (pitcher) (1941–2020), American baseball player for the Baltimore Orioles

Other
John F. Miller (American football) (1890–?), American football, basketball, and baseball coach and college athletics administrator
John Miller (cyclist) (1881–1957), British Olympic road racing cyclist
John Miller (basketball), American basketball coach
John Miller (rower) (1903–1965), American rower
John Miller (cricketer) (1770–1825), English first-class cricketer
John Miller (weightlifter) (1909-1983), American Olympic weightlifter
J. J. Miller (born 1933), Australian jockey and horse trainer
Spider Miller (John Miller, born c. 1950), American amateur golfer

Literature and journalism
John Jackson Miller (born 1968), American comic book writer and commentator
John J. Miller (journalist) (born 1970), American political reporter
John J. Miller (author) (1954–2022), science fiction author known for his work in the Wild Cards series
John Miller (author), historical fiction author
John Miller (journalist and author) (1932–2020), British journalist and author
John Miller (police official) (born 1958/9), New York Police Department official, former FBI official, journalist and former television host
John Ramsey Miller (born 1949), American author
John Miller (writer) (born 1968), Canadian writer and consultant
John Henry Miller (1702–1782), printer and publisher
John Miller (literary historian), British academic
John Miller (historian) (born 1946), British historian

Others
John C. Miller, CEO of Cali Group
John Miller (engineer) (1805–1883), Edinburgh-based railway engineer (Grainger & Miller)
John A. Miller (1872–1941), roller coaster designer and builder
John E. Miller III (born 1949), American marine biologist and Anglican bishop
John Miller (minister), Moderator of the General Assembly of the Church of Scotland, 2001
J. Michael Miller (born 1946), Canadian prelate of the Roman Catholic Church
John Milton Miller (1882–1962), American electrical engineer
John William Miller (1895–1978), American philosopher
John Samuel Miller (1779–1830), English naturalist
Captain John H. Miller, fictional character in the 1998 film Saving Private Ryan
John Miller (entomologist) (1882–1952), American entomologist
John Chester Miller (1907–1991), American historian
John Harry Miller (1869–1940), Scottish theologian and principal of St Marys College at St Andrews University
John H. Miller Jr., American physicist
John William Miller (aviation) (1880–1953), American aviation pioneer, civil engineer, and professor
John P. Miller (educator) (fl. 1960s–2000s), Canadian educator
SS John Miller, a Liberty ship

See also
Johnny Miller (disambiguation)
John Millar (disambiguation)
Jack Miller (disambiguation)
Jonathan Miller (disambiguation), also Jon Miller
Miller (name)